The creation, selling, and smuggling of illegal firearms are one of the most common crimes in the Philippines. Filipino-made local guns, built in secret factories, are sold and circulated not just in the country but also abroad.

History
Filipino gunsmithing can be traced back to World War II where Filipino guerillas fighting the Japanese built their own weapons and firearms, most notably the paltik, boga, and guerilla shotguns. Pipe guns are known to have originated in the Philippines. Knowledge would then be passed down from generation to generation until the present day. Danao, Cebu is the area known for making illegal firearms, although factories in Samar and Mindanao also exist. Even in the modern day, most of these firearms are built in secret factories and huts in the mountains and jungles. Mayor Ramonito “Nito” Durano III of Cebu have once tried to reach out to President Rodrigo Duterte in the hopes of discussing the possibility of legalizing such gunsmithing factories.

Most of these firearms end up being sold to private citizens, insurgents, and criminals. Syndicates in the Philippines have also taken advantage of illegal firearm trade, with the Waray-Waray Gang being the most notable firearm trafficking group in the Philippines. Common illegally manufactured firearms in the Philippines include:
 Paltik
 Boga
 Lantaka
 Luthang
 Various M1911s

International shipment
Filipino guns have been recorded to be smuggled and used in the United States of America and Japan, mostly in the hands of gangs. Common ones sold are homemade Colt .45s and assault rifles. One infamous case occurred on November 29, 2019, when Yakuza leader Keiichi Furukawa of the Yamaguchi-gumi was gunned down by a splinter Kobe group with an M653P rifle, a Filipino imitation of the CAR-15. The gun was tracked down by Japanese police to the Philippines.

References 

Crime in the Philippines by type
Organized crime in the Philippines